Bon Air is an unincorporated community in Sumner County, in the U.S. state of Tennessee.

History
Bon Air probably refers to "good air".

References

Unincorporated communities in Sumner County, Tennessee
Unincorporated communities in Tennessee